Live from the Legendary Sun Studios is a live album by Grace Potter and the Nocturnals. It was recorded over several sessions at the famed Sun Studio in Memphis in 2008, while the band was on tour.

The live album was released on Record Store Day 2012. It is available on both CD and Vinyl.

Track listing

 "Night Rolls On" - 3:11
 "Outta My Tree" - 3:30
 "Sugar" - 4:35
 "Put Your Head Down" - 4:20
 "One Short Night" - 4:03
 "Can't See Through" - 5:09
 "Fooling Myself" - 6:53

References

2012 live albums
Grace Potter and the Nocturnals albums